Senator Boggs may refer to:

J. Caleb Boggs (1909–1993), U.S. Senator from Delaware from 1961 to 1973
Larry Boggs (born 1946), Oklahoma State Senate
Lilburn Boggs (1796–1860), Missouri State Senate
Tex Boggs (born 1938), Wyoming State Senate
William Benton Boggs (1854–1922), Louisiana State Senate